Bahman Salari; is an Iranian football forward who plays for Shahin Bushehr in the Iran Pro League.

Club career

Saipa
He started his career with Saipa from youth levels. In July 2013 he joined the first team by Engin Firat. He made his debut for Saipa on April 6, 2014 against Fajr Sepasi as a substitute.

Club career statistics

Honours

Individual
Hazfi Cup top scorer: 2019–20

References

External links
 Bahman Salari at PersianLeague.com
 Bahman Salari at IranLeague.ir

1993 births
Living people
Iranian footballers
Saipa F.C. players
Shahr Khodro F.C. players
People from Alborz Province
Association football forwards
Shahin Bushehr F.C. players